The Mixed doubles tournament of the 2006 BWF World Junior Championships is a badminton world junior individual championships for the Eye Level Cups, held on November 6–11. The defending champion of the last edition were He Hanbin and Yu Yang from China. The host pair Lee Yong-dae and Yoo Hyun-young won the gold medal in this event after beat Li Tian and Ma Jin of China in rubber games with the score 18–21, 21–19, 21–14.

Seeded 

 Lee Yong-Dae / Yoo Hyun-Young (champion)
 Tan Wee Kiong / Woon Khe Wei (fourth round)
 Hu Wenqing / Wang Xiaoli (semi-final)
 Liu Xiaolong / Liao Jingmei (semi-final)
 Boris Ma / Victoria Na (third round)
 Kevin Dennerly-Minturn / Emma Rodgers (third round)
 Mads Pieler Kolding / Line Damkjær Kruse (quarter-final)
 Viki Indra Okvana / Richi Puspita Dili (quarter-final)
 Cho Gun-Woo / Hong Soo-Jung (third round)
 Chris Adcock / Gabrielle White (fourth round)
 Emmanuel Pun / Lauren Todt (second round)
 Gordey Kosenko / Victoria Yushkova (second round)
 Henry Tam / Danielle Barry (third round)
 Illian Krastev / Dimitria Popstoikova (second round)
 Mohd Lutfi Zaim Abdul Khalid / Goh Liu Ying (fourth round)
 Wong Shu Ki / Chan Tsz Ka (second round)

Finals

Top Half

Section 1

Section 2

Section 3

Section 4

Bottom Half

Section 5

Section 6

Section 7

Section 8

References

External links 

 Tournament Draw at www.koreabadminton.org

2006 BWF World Junior Championships
2006 in youth sport